Johnny Trí Nguyễn is a Vietnamese–American actor, martial artist, action choreographer and stuntman who is mainly active in the Vietnamese film industry.

Born in Bình Dương, Saigon, Vietnam, Nguyễn and his family immigrated to the United States of America when he was 9.  He competed as a martial artist on the U.S. national team, and then transitioned into a career as a stuntman in Hollywood, working on films such as Spider-Man 2 and Jarhead.

Nguyễn later returned to Vietnam and starred in The Rebel, a period martial arts film released in 2007 and directed by his brother Charlie Nguyễn.  It was a massive success in Vietnam, garnering unprecedented attention for a locally made film.  Nguyễn followed The Rebel by starring in a steady stream of hit films, many of which were directed by his brother, including Clash in 2009, Để Mai tính in 2010, and Tèo Em in 2013, all of which broke box office records at the time of release.
In a controversial decision, Vietnamese censors banned Nguyễn's 2013 action film Bui Doi Cho Lon for its violent content.

Besides his work in Vietnamese films, Nguyễn has had supporting roles in major films from Thailand (Tony Jaa's Tom-Yum-Goong) and India (7aum Arivu and Irumbu Kuthirai).2014
ref>The Hollywood Reporter Vietnamese censors ban local gangster film 'Chinatown' Patrick Brzeski, June 11, 2013

Filmography

References

External links

Living people
21st-century Vietnamese male actors
Vietnamese male film actors
People from Ho Chi Minh City
Year of birth missing (living people)
American film actors of Vietnamese descent